The 2013–14 Morehead State Eagles men's basketball team represented Morehead State University during the 2013–14 NCAA Division I men's basketball season. The Eagles, led by second year head coach Sean Woods, played their home games at Ellis Johnson Arena and were members of the East Division of the Ohio Valley Conference. They finished the season 20–14, 10–6 in OVC play to finish in third place in the East Division. They advanced to the semifinals of the OVC tournament where they lost to Belmont. They were invited to the College Basketball Invitational where they lost in the first round to Illinois State.

Roster

Schedule

|-
!colspan=9 style="background:#000099; color:#FFD51D;"| Regular season

|-
!colspan=9 style="background:#000099; color:#FFD51D;"| Ohio Valley Conference tournament

|-
!colspan=9 style="background:#000099; color:#FFD51D;"| CBI

References

Morehead State Eagles men's basketball seasons
Morehead State
Morehead State